Rafael Matos and Felipe Meligeni Alves were the defending champions but only Meligeni Alves chose to defend his title, partnering Matheus Pucinelli de Almeida. Meligeni Alves withdrew before his first round match due to injury.

Boris Arias and Federico Zeballos won the title after defeating Guido Andreozzi and Guillermo Durán 7–5, 6–2 in the final.

Seeds

Draw

References

External links
 Main draw

Campeonato Internacional de Tênis de Campinas - Doubles
2022 Doubles